Raj Krishna was an Indian economist who taught at the Delhi School of Economics. He is most famous for the phrase "Hindu rate of growth" which he coined for India's low rate of GDP growth between the 1950s and 1980s.

Further reading
 
 

Academic staff of Delhi University
20th-century Indian economists
Year of death missing
Year of birth missing